Red Army Mostar is a FK Velež Mostar supporters' group in Bosnia and Herzegovina.

History
Red Army was founded in 1981 in Mostar under the name Crveni šejtani (Red Devils), after FK Velež Mostar won its first Yugoslav Cup final. The final game was won with a score of 3-2 against FK Željezničar at the Marakana stadium in front of more than 40,000 people. Following its inception, Crveni šejtani fell into a period of decline, but resurfaced again in 1986, when FK Velež once again reached the final of the Yugoslav Cup versus Dinamo Zagreb.

The game was won by Velež with a final score of 3-1. After that game, Crveni šejtani were renamed to Red Army. During that period, subgroups formed, including the Zealots, Eagles, Chicago, Furia, Carina and others. The group of FK Velež fans in Sarajevo was called Red Platoon.

During the Yugoslavia period, FK Velež was considered the pride of Herzegovina and was supported by all Herzegovinians. The fan base spanned Yugoslavia, with the most support coming from Konjic, Čapljina, Travnik, Doboj, Tuzla and Dubrovnik.

During the 1985–86 season, Mostar was a town of 110,000 people. However, eight-thousand Red Army members traveled to Split to watch a Hajduk-Velež match. This is just one of the many examples of the love that Red Army had for Velež. Velež was viewed as a multi-ethnic team. Many Bosniaks, Croats and Serbs played in FK Velež.

With the collapse of Yugoslavia, Velež collapsed as well. Today, members of the Red Army are mostly Bosniaks. A few Serbs and Croats are still involved. While Bosnians are a majority, the group accept all nationalities. Attendance at the stadium rarely reached levels seen in the 1980s, but during certain occasions large numbers of fans still gather.

Present day
Today, Red Army Mostar is mostly composed of people from Mostar. A few groups come from Ilidža, Konjic, Jablanica, Čapljina and Stolac.

Red Army's biggest rivals today are Ultras Mostar, a supporter group of another team from Mostar HŠK Zrinjski Mostar. The rivalry is based both on locality, ethnicity and politics. FK Velež and Red Army are multiethnic, while Zrinjski and Ultras are only Croats. Moreover, it is right to say that Red Army is nationalistic left wing oriented while ultras are nationalistic right wing oriented. The rivalry began after the end of the Bosnian War, mostly because of conflict between Bosniaks and Croats during the war.

The city of Mostar was divided between the east side, which is predominantly Bosniak, and the west side, which is predominantly Croat. Velež's old stadium, Bijeli Brijeg Stadium remained in the west side of Mostar, so the club had to find a new stadium to be able to play matches. Its old stadium was given to Zrinjski. Matches between Velež and Zrinjski are often afflicted with high levels of conflict.

Songs
The official anthem of the Red Army Mostar is Ili grmi il' se zemlja trese by MO Selection Band. Later, a band called Red Army Band recorded seven songs that quickly became popular among Velež fans. Other artists did the same too, so today there are a lot of recorded songs about the red club from Mostar.

References

External links
 KN Red Army Mostar 
 UG Mostarski Rođeni 
 Rođeni.com 
 FK Velež Mostar 

Bosnia and Herzegovina football supporters' associations
FK Velež Mostar
Ultras groups